Abraham Kosgei Chebii (born 23 December 1979 in Kaptabuk, Marakwet District) is a former Kenyan runner who specialized in the 5000 metres. His personal best time is 12:52.99 minutes, achieved in June 2003 in Oslo.

Career
He represented Kenya at the 2004 Athens Olympics and reached the final but failed to finish the race. Chebii won the individual and team silver medals in the short race at the 2005 IAAF World Cross Country Championships. He has won a number of races on the athletics circuit including the Cross Internacional de Itálica in 2002 and the Great Ireland Run in 2007 and 2008. He gained selection for the 5000 m at the 2009 IAAF World Athletics Final and came in ninth place.

He won the Discovery Kenya Half Marathon in Eldoret in January 2011, beating the runner-up Vincent Kipruto by a small margin of eleven seconds. His next outing came at the Roma-Ostia Half Marathon and he came third, achieving a personal best of 1:00:07 on the flat course.

He graduated from Marakwet High School in 1997. He was spotted by Moses Kiptanui whose team Chebii joined.

He belongs to Kimbia Athletics team and is managed by Tom Ratcliffe and coached by Dieter Hogen. Chebii belongs to Marakwet, a tribe of Kalenjin people. He lives now in Eldoret, Kenya.  He is married and with two children (as of 2006).

Achievements

References

External links
 
 Pace Sports Management
 IAAF, September 15, 2004: Focus on Africa - Abraham Kosgei Chebii (KEN)

1979 births
Living people
Kenyan male middle-distance runners
Kenyan male long-distance runners
Athletes (track and field) at the 2004 Summer Olympics
Olympic athletes of Kenya
People from West Pokot County
20th-century Kenyan people
21st-century Kenyan people